Victor Vladimirovich Petryashov (16 March 1956 - 2 July 2018) was a Russian zoologist, carcinologist, hydrobiologist and biogeographer. His scientific research focused on  taxonomy and distribution of malacostracan crustaceans, particularly orders Mysida, Lophogastrida and Leptostraca, and marine biogeography and hydrobiology of Arctic, Antarctic and temperate seas of the World, and he published over 120 works. V.V. Petryashov spent all his professional life in St. Petersburg in the Zoological Institute of the Russian Academy of Sciences. As a senior researcher he also curated the malacostracan crustacean collection of the Zoological Institute.

Named taxa 
Mysida:
Paracanthomysis shikhotaniensis Petrjashov, 1983
Stylomysis arcticoglacialis (Petryashov, 1990) (originally Mysis arcticoglacialis Petryashov, 1990)
Michthyops arcticus Petryashov, 1993
Meterythrops muranous Petryashov, 2015
Stellamblyops Petryashov et Frutos, 2017
Stellamblyops vassilenkoae Petryashov et Frutos, 2017

Lophogastrida:
Neognathophausia Petryashov, 1992
Fagegnathophausia Petryashov, 2015

Leptostraca:
Pseudonebaliopsis Petryashov, 1996
Pseudonebaliopsis atlantica Petryashov, 1996
Sarsinebalia pseudotyphlops Petryashov, 2016
Nebaliella kurila Petryashov, 2016
Nebaliella ochotica Petryashov, 2017

References

External links 
 Petryashov Victor Vladimirovich 

1956 births
2018 deaths
People from Nyandomsky District
Carcinologists
Biogeographers
Saint Petersburg State University alumni
Scientists from Saint Petersburg
21st-century Russian zoologists
20th-century Russian zoologists